Napier Road  is a major road located within the Tanglin Planning Area in Singapore. 

The road starts with its junction with Holland Road and Cluny Road near the Singapore Botanic Gardens to the west, and ends at its junction with Tanglin Road and Grange Road to the east, near the Orchard Road shopping belt.

Etymology and history
Napier Road is named after William "Royal Billy" Napier (born 1804), the first lawyer in Singapore in 1833. He arrived in Singapore in 1831 and married George Drumgoole Coleman's widow, Maria Frances. 

Napier Road originally led to Napier's house, known as Tang Leng in Chinese, which he built in 1854. He was one of the founders of the Singapore Free Press and a shareholder of the Raffles Library and Museum. Later he became the Lieutenant Governor of Labuan because of his friendship with Sir James Brooke (1803-1868). He retired in 1857.

Landmarks
The prominent landmarks located along Napier Road include:
Australian High Commission
British Council
British High Commission
Embassy of the United States of America
Gleneagles Hospital
Gleneagles Medical Centre
Ministry of Foreign Affairs
Napier MRT station
Singapore Botanic Gardens
Former Tanglin Police Station
Tanglin Post Office
INTERPOL Global Complex for Innovation (IGCI)

References
Victor R Savage, Brenda S A Yeoh (2004), Toponymics - A Study of Singapore Street Names, Eastern University Press, 

Roads in Singapore
Tanglin